St. David School may refer to:

In the United States:

St. David School (Richmond)
St. David School (Willow Grove, PA)
Saint David's School (New York City)

In Canada:

  St. David Catholic Secondary School (Waterloo)

See also
St. David's School (disambiguation)